MV Tricia is a ferry owned by the Public Transport Authority and operated under contract by Captain Cook Cruises on Transperth services on the Swan River in Perth, Western Australia. It was named by public vote after the longest-residing member of Perth Zoo, Tricia the Asian elephant.

History
In November 2017, the Public Transport Authority called for tenders for a new ferry to replace . In December 2018, the contract was awarded to Dongara Marine of Port Denison. 

The vessel entered service on 20 December 2019, its maiden voyage involving a special trip down the Swan River passing the Swan Bells, Matagarup Bridge and Optus Stadium.

References

Ferries of Western Australia
Ships built in Western Australia
2019 ships